Saaj or Saj is a village located in the Thanamandi tehsil in Rajouri district of the Indian union territory of Jammu and Kashmir. Saaj lies off NH 144A approximately equidistant from both Rajouri and Thanamandi.

Population and Agriculture
Lohar (Blacksmith), Kamhars (Potters), and Tarkhan (Carpenters) are among some of the most prominent professions. The major part of the population of Saaj depends on farming for their livelihood. Others are government workers or jobs less focused on manual labor. Some animals like buffalo, goats, and sheep are commonly reared, on which people relied on for their livelihood.

According to 2011 census data, Saaj has 946 households and a population of 4,112 (2,148 males and 1,964 females)

The climate of Saaj is moderate and is suitable for various crops and vegetation. The main crops of Saaj are maize (مکی), wheat (گندم), and paddy (دھان).

Maize is cultivated in the middle and upper portion of the village, while Paddy is cultivated in the lower portion of the village, along with wheat cultivated all over the village. Vegetables are also grown in Saaj on a small scale. Saaj is also full of natural vegetation. It has grasslands, meadows, trees, herbs, bushes, and common land for cattle.

2011 Census Detail of Village Saaj

Religion in Saaj 
The whole population of the village is Muslim, which is based on several castes, including the Bhatti, Khokhar, Gujjar, Thaker, Lohar, Kashmiri and Janjua caste. The caste of "Bhatti" is widely spread throughout the village.

Local Landmarks 
 Historical Fort (مغل سراۓ ) 
 Historical Pond (تالاب ) 
 Holy Tomb of Baba Jallian Wali Sarkar (زیارت بابا جلیانوالی سرکار)  
 Leeran Wali Bawli

References

Villages in Rajouri district